Trimeresurus phuketensis (also known as the Phuket pit viper) is a species of pit viper found on Phuket Island in Thailand.

References 

phuketensis